Eremias fahimii (commonly known as Fahimi's racerunner) is a species of lizard in the family Lacertidae found in Iran.

Distribution and habitat 
It is found in the Markazi Province up to the western side of Tehran Province. It may also occur in the Alborz, Qom, Qazvin and Zanjan provinces.

References 

Eremias